Ninos Khoshaba is an Australian politician of Assyrian descent, and is a former member of Parliament of New South Wales. He was a member of Parliament from 24 March 2007 until 26 March 2011, where he lost his seat to Andrew Rohan of the Liberal Party. Khoshaba currently serves as a member of Fairfield City Council, and has represented the ward of Parks since his election in 2012. He previously served in this capacity from 2004 until resigning in 2008 following his election to parliament.

Early life
Born in Iraq on 24 March 1970, Khoshaba is the eldest of three children to parents Anwar Khoshaba and Athour Khoshaba. He migrated from Iraq to Australia in 1970 when only four months old. His father worked as a bulldozer driver and in 1991 his father was elected as a councillor on Fairfield City Council. His father eventually became the Mayor of Fairfield and was the first mayor of Assyrian background in Australia. His father was awarded the Order of Australia medal in 2000.

He attended Our Lady of the Rosary Primary School in Fairfield and St Johns Park High School.

Political career
In March 2004 he was elected as a councillor on Fairfield City Council, following his father's footsteps. In October 2004 he became an electorate officer working for the federal member for Prospect Chris Bowen.

He was elected to the New South Wales Parliament in 2007 for the Electoral district of Smithfield. He was Deputy Chair of the Standing Committee on Public Works and a member of the Public Accounts Committee. In the 2011 New South Wales state election Khoshaba lost his seat to Andrew Rohan after suffering a 19.9% swing.

Personal
Khoshaba is married and has three children

References

 

Members of the New South Wales Legislative Assembly
Living people
1970 births
Australian Labor Party members of the Parliament of New South Wales
Australian politicians of Assyrian descent
Australian people of Iraqi-Assyrian descent
Iraqi emigrants to Australia
21st-century Australian politicians